Barakatabad or Barekatabad or Barkatabad may refer to:
Barakatabad, Hamadan
Barakatabad, Lorestan
Barakatabad, Sistan and Baluchestan